Jakub Bąk (born 28 May 1993) is a Polish footballer who plays as a forward for Wieczysta Kraków.

Career

Club
He started his career with Stal Rzeszów. He made his debut for Korona Kielce on 5 March 2011 in a 3–1 away defeat to Widzew Łódź.

On 21 August 2020, he joined Garbarnia Kraków.

International
He was called-up to Poland U17, U18 and U20.

References

External links
 
 

1993 births
People from Rzeszów
Sportspeople from Podkarpackie Voivodeship
Living people
Polish footballers
Poland youth international footballers
Association football forwards
Korona Kielce players
GKS Tychy players
Pogoń Szczecin players
Wisła Płock players
Bytovia Bytów players
Chojniczanka Chojnice players
Podbeskidzie Bielsko-Biała players
Puszcza Niepołomice players
Garbarnia Kraków players
Wieczysta Kraków players
Ekstraklasa players
I liga players
II liga players